Tilquiapan Zapotec (Zapoteco de San Miguel Tilquiápam) is an Oto-Manguean language of the Zapotecan branch, spoken in southern Oaxaca, Mexico.

Santa Inés Yatzechi Zapotec is close enough to be considered a dialect, and Ocotlán Zapotec is also close. They were measured at 87% and 59% intelligibility, respectively, in recorded text testing.

Sounds

Vowels

Each vowel can also be glottalized, a phenomenon manifested as either creaky voice throughout the vowel or, more commonly, as a sequence of a vowel and a glottal stop optionally followed by an echo of the vowel.

Consonants

There are two exceptions to this in Tilquiapan:
 The contrast between fortis  and lenis 
 The contrast between fortis  and lenis 
Neither is voiceless, but  is pronounced a little longer and  replaces  in certain causative verbs in ways similar to other fortis/lenis consonantal changes (e.g.  'get loose' vs.  'let loose').

Notes

References

 

Zapotec languages